Șerbăneasa may refer to several places in Romania:

 Șerbăneasa, a village in Valea Lungă Commune, Dâmbovița County
 Șerbăneasa, a village in Nicolae Bălcescu Commune, Vâlcea County
 Șerbăneasa (river), a tributary of the river Topolog in Vâlcea County

See also 
 Șerban (name)
 Șerbești (disambiguation)
 Șerbănești (disambiguation)
 Șerbănescu (surname)